Alexander M. Schenker (December 20, 1924 – August 21, 2019) was an American Slavist of Polish descent, professor of Slavic linguistics at Yale University, and the recipient of the Award for Distinguished Contributions to Slavic Studies for his contributions to the field of Polish studies, as well for the general contributions to the development of the field of Slavic studies in the United States.

Biography
Schenker was born to a Jewish family in Kraków in 1924, the son of Oskar Szenker and Gizela née Szamińska.

He was enrolled at the university in Dushanbe (then Stalinabad) in Tajikistan during World War II. Later he studied at the Sorbonne, receiving his Ph.D. from Yale in 1953, where he eventually settled as a professor of Slavic studies.

Work
At Yale University in the 1950s he participated in the creation of one of America's leading programs of Slavic languages and literatures, culminating in what was to become a classic textbook for teaching Polish in English: Beginning Polish (1966). His other notable works include:
 Polish Declension (1964), monograph
 Polish Conjugation (1954), article
 Gender Categories in Polish (1955), article
 Some Remarks on Polish Quantifiers (1971), article
 The Slavic Literary Languages: Formation and Development, coedited with Edward Stankiewicz (1980),
 The Dawn of Slavic: An Introduction to Slavic Philology (1996), his greatest book, receiving MLA'ss Scaglione Prize for Studies in Slavic Languages and Literatures.
 The Bronze Horseman: Falconet's Monument to Peter the Great (2003)

References

 Alexander M. Schenker, winner of the 2007 American Association for the Advancement of Slavic Studies

External links
 The Dawn of Slavic - The first chapter of The Dawn of Slavic: An Introduction to Slavic Philology, in PDF

Slavists
Writers from Kraków
Polish emigrants to the United States
University of Paris alumni
Yale University alumni
Yale University faculty
American people of Polish-Jewish descent
1924 births
2019 deaths
Polish expatriates in the Soviet Union
Polish expatriates in France